Notting Gate (also known as Notting Hill) is a neighbourhood located in Cumberland Ward, in the suburb of Orleans in Ottawa, Ontario, Canada.  Located south of Innes Road, east of Portobello Boulevard, west of Trim Road, and north of Brian Coburn Boulevard (formerly Blackburn Bypass) . According to the Canada 2011 Census, this area had a population of 4,232.

Major streets in the neighbourhood include:
 Innes Road
 Trim Road
 Brian Coburn Boulevard
 Portobello Boulevard
 Provence Avenue
 Scala Avenue

Schools 

There are three elementary-level schools and one secondary school serving the needs of students in the neighbourhood.
 École élémentaire catholique de la Découverte
 École élémentaire Des Sentiers
 Avalon Public School
 École secondaire catholique Béatrice-Desloges

Shopping 

There is one shopping mall located on the southwest corner of Innes and Trim roads including:
 Tim Hortons
 Sobeys
 LCBO
 Subway
 Gabriel's Pizza
 CIBC
 Yalla Yalla Bakery & Lebanese Food
 The Clocktower Brew Pub
 Soul Stone Restaurant
 Tiny Hoppers Daycare
 9Round Fitness

References

Neighbourhoods in Ottawa